Gábor Pintér (born 9 March 1964) is a Hungarian prelate of the Catholic Church who was Apostolic Nuncio to Belarus from 2016 to 2019 and has been Apostolic Nuncio to Honduras since 2019.

Career
Gábor Pintér was born on 9 March 1964 in Kunszentmárton, Hungary. He was ordained a priest on 11 June 1987.

He entered the diplomatic service of the Holy See on 1 July 1996 and served in Haiti, Bolivia, Sweden, France, the Philippines and Austria.

On 13 May 2016, Pope Francis named him titular archbishop of Velebusdus and Apostolic Nuncio to Belarus. He received his episcopal consecration on 15 July 2016 in the Cathedral of Vac from Cardinal Pietro Parolin, Secretary of State. On 12 November 2019, he was appointed Apostolic Nuncio to Honduras.

See also
 List of heads of the diplomatic missions of the Holy See

References

External links
 Catholic Hierarchy: Archbishop Gábor Pintér 

Living people
1964 births
People from Kunszentmárton
Apostolic Nuncios to Belarus
Apostolic Nuncios to Honduras